Qazi Imdadul Haq (1882–1926) was a Bengali writer.

Teaching 
Haq joined the Calcutta Madrasa (now Aliah University) as a temporary teacher in 1904. In 1906, he worked briefly in the Education Department in Shillong, Assam. The next year he joined the Dhaka Madrasa as a teacher. In 1911, he became a professor of Geography at the Dhaka Teachers' Training College, in 1914, Assistant School Inspector of Muslim Education for the Dhaka Division, and headmaster of the Calcutta Training School in 1917. In 1921, he became superintendent of the newly founded Dhaka Education Board and continued there until his death.

In recognition of his services, the British Government awarded him the titles Khan Sahib in 1919 and Khan Bahadur in 1926.

Journalism 
Haq was  involved with M. Hedayetullah, Syed Emdad Ali and M. Asad Ali to publish monthly Nabanur (1903–06) and was president of the Publication Committee of the Bangiya Mussalman Sahitya Patrika, a Bengali literary quarterly established on 4 September 1911 in Calcutta.

In May 1920, Haq became an editor of Shiksak, an educational monthly magazine and remained with this magazine for three years. He was also a writer and earned considerable fame for his poems, novels, essays, and children's literature.

Literary works
Abdullah 
Alexandriar Prachin Pustakagar (The Ancient Library of Alexandria)
Abdur Rahmaner Kirti (The great deeds of Abdur Rahman)
France-e Muslim Odhikar (Muslim Conquest of France)
Alhamra
Pagal Kholifa (The Crazy Caliph)
Muslim Jagater Biggan Charcha (Science in the Muslim World)
Nabi Kahani (Tales of Prophets)

Personal life 
Haq was the father of Kazi Anwarul Haque, a bureaucrat, technocrat adviser-minister and writer of Bangladesh.

Haq died on 20 March 1926 in Kolkata.

References

1882 births
1926 deaths
Bangladeshi male writers
Qazi Imdadul Haq
Qazi Imdadul Haq
People from Khulna District
People from Khulna

 Writers from West Bengal

Bengali Muslims